The Stinger Meets the Golden Thrush is an album by jazz organist Johnny "Hammond" Smith with vocalist Byrdie Green recorded for the Prestige label in 1966.

Reception

The Allmusic site awarded the album 3 stars.

Track listing
All compositions by Johnny "Hammond" Smith except as indicated
 "The Golden Thrush" - 3:20   
 "They Call It Stormy Monday" (T-Bone Walker) - 4:37   
 "Broadway"  (Billy Byrd, Teddy McRae, Henri Woode) - 5:24   
 "On a Clear Day" (Alan Jay Lerner, Burton Lane) - 4:23   
 "Oriole" - 3:55   
 "If I Ruled the World" (Leslie Bricusse, Cyril Ornadel) - 3:22   
 "Blue Jay" - 5:20   
 "How I Lost My Love" (Hank Snow) - 5:35

Personnel
Johnny "Hammond" Smith - organ
Byrdie Green - vocals (tracks 2 & 6)
Otis Sutton - alto saxophone
Houston Person  - tenor saxophone
Eddie McFadden - guitar
Leo Stevens - drums

Production
 Cal Lampley - producer
 Rudy Van Gelder - engineer

References

Johnny "Hammond" Smith albums
1966 albums
Prestige Records albums
Albums produced by Cal Lampley
Albums recorded at Van Gelder Studio